David Bradstreet (born London, England) is a Canadian-based musician. He spent his childhood in Oakville, Ontario and began his music career in the late 1960s. He is best known for his song "Renaissance" ("Let’s Dance That Old Dance Once More") - a hit for the Canadian country and folk musician, Valdy. He has been recognized for his work as a singer-songwriter, composer and producer, twenty albums bearing his name; a Juno Award early in his career; three subsequent Juno nominations and music credits including a Gemini nomination; film and television soundtracks and scoring; talent discovery and record production for numerous artists from Jane Siberry to Colleen Peterson. He has toured extensively and is a veteran of many coffeehouses, concert halls and folk festivals.

Awards and recognition
1978: winner, Juno Award, most promising male vocalist
1999: nominee, Juno Award, with Dan Gibson for best instrumental album, Whispering Woods
2000: nominee, Juno Award, with Dan Gibson for best instrumental album, Natural Sleep Inducement
2002: nominee, Juno Award, with Dan Gibson for best instrumental album, Angel's Embrace

Discography
(partial)
1976: David Bradstreet
1977: "Dreaming in Colour"
1980: "Black & White"
1998: "Renaissance"
2006: Lifelines
2007 TheraSleep
2007 TheraCalm
2010 08.20.10 Bradstreet & Keesee
2020 Best Foot Forward

External links
David Bradstreet Music
Jam Pop Encyclopedia: David Bradstreet, accessed 25 November 2006

Year of birth missing (living people)
Living people
British expatriates in Canada
Juno Award for Breakthrough Artist of the Year winners
English male singer-songwriters
Canadian folk singer-songwriters
Canadian male singer-songwriters